Legends of the Lost with Megan Fox is an American docu-series starring and co-created by Megan Fox that premiered on December 4, 2018 on the Travel Channel.

Synopsis
In the docu-series, we learn that "Fox has been obsessed since an early age with the history of ancient cultures, people and places — always questioning their documented story." We follow her "embarking on an epic and personal journey across the globe" where Fox, archaeologists and experts will "re-examine history, asking tough questions and challenging the conventional wisdom that has existed for centuries". Among other themes, the series will consider whether female Amazon warriors really existed and whether the Trojan War was a historical event.

Production
The series was originally titled Mysteries and Myths with Megan Fox. In July 2018, shooting for the documentary was being done in Istanbul, Turkey.

Episodes

Academic criticism
The program attracted media criticism for its mix of historical fact and pseudoarchaeology: writing in The Washington Post, David S. Anderson highlighted Fox's self-professed interest in ancient astronauts theories and the show's "complicated relationship with academic authorities", and accused her of using academics "as steppingstones to offer unsubstantiated claims about the ancient world." He concluded promoting “alternative facts” comes with a cost. “Legends of the Lost” may have entertained and may even have sparked curiosity in the ancient world, but it has also profoundly blurred the lines between truth and fiction."

References

External links
 Legends of the Lost with Megan Fox on Travel Channel
 

2018 American television series debuts
English-language television shows
Travel Channel original programming
2018 American television series endings